The 1997 NCAA Men's Division II Ice Hockey Tournament involved 2 schools playing in a best of three game series to determine the national champion of men's NCAA Division II college ice hockey.  A total of 3 games were played, hosted by Bemidji State University.

Bemidji State, coached by Bob Peters, won the national title over Alabama-Huntsville, two games to one.

Marc Lafleur, was the tournament's leading scorer with four points.

Tournament Format
One eastern and one western team were invited to play a modified best-of-three tournament. In the first two games the teams would be awarded points (2 points for a win, one point for a tie) and whichever team had the most points would be the champion. If the teams were tied after two games then a 20-minute mini-game would be played to determine the champion.

Qualifying teams

Tournament Games

Note: * denotes overtime period(s)Note: Mini-games in italics

Tournament Awards
None Awarded

External links

 
NCAA Men's Division II Ice Hockey Tournament
NCAA men's ice hockey championship
NCAA Division II men's ice hockey tournament